Plainview or Plain View may refer to:

Plainview, Arkansas
Plainview, California
Plainview, Georgia
Plainview, Illinois
Plainview, Louisville, Kentucky
Plainview, Minnesota
Plainview, Nebraska
Plainview, New York
Plain View, North Carolina
Plainview, South Dakota
Plainview, Tennessee
Plainview, Texas
Plainview, Wharton County, Texas
Plain View, King and Queen County, Virginia
Plain View, Powhatan County, Virginia
Plainview Township (disambiguation)

See also
Plain view doctrine
Plainview point, a Paleo-Indian projectile point